James Stannard (born 21 February 1983) is an Australian rugby union footballer. He can operate as a scrum-half or fly-half. He previously played for the Western Force and Brumbies Super Rugby.

Stannard was an Australia sevens player and was awarded the 2010 Australian Sevens Player of the Year award. He competed at the 2016 Summer Olympics.

Stannard is currently part of the coaching staff for the Women's Aussie 7s rugby team.

Injury and retirement
On 30 March 2018, Stannard received a fractured skull in an altercation with a 23 year old English tourist, Sam Oliver. The two men had left a Sydney bar at 3am with the altercation ensuing outside a kebab shop. Stannard was knocked unconscious from a single punch during the incident and hit his head on the concrete floor.  Following his head injury, Stannard has suffered from vertigo.

In June 2018, Stannard was forced to retire from playing rugby due to the head injuries he received in the altercation.

Sam Oliver claimed that he retaliated in self-defence after Stannard had approached him, made an offensive remark, and initially punched Oliver's left eye. In September 2018, following a two-and-a-half day hearing, Oliver was found not guilty of recklessly causing grievous bodily harm.

References

External links
 
 
 

Living people
1983 births
Australian rugby union players
ACT Brumbies players
Western Force players
Rugby union fly-halves
Rugby union scrum-halves
Commonwealth Games rugby sevens players of Australia
Male rugby sevens players
Australia international rugby sevens players
Commonwealth Games silver medallists for Australia
Rugby sevens players at the 2016 Summer Olympics
Olympic rugby sevens players of Australia
Commonwealth Games medallists in rugby sevens
Rugby sevens players at the 2010 Commonwealth Games
Commonwealth Games bronze medallists for Australia
Rugby sevens players at the 2014 Commonwealth Games
Medallists at the 2010 Commonwealth Games